The TCA Award for Individual Achievement in Drama is an award given by the Television Critics Association.

Winners and nominees

Multiple wins
3 wins
 James Gandolfini (consecutive)

2 wins
 Andre Braugher (consecutive)
 Jon Hamm
 Hugh Laurie (consecutive)

Multiple nominees

6 nominations
 Bryan Cranston
 James Gandolfini

5 nominations
 Jon Hamm
 Kiefer Sutherland

4 nominations
 Hugh Laurie
 Matthew Rhys

3 nominations
 Edie Falco
 Dennis Franz
 Julianna Margulies
 Bob Odenkirk
 Martin Sheen

2 nominations
 Andre Braugher
 Connie Britton
 Glenn Close
 Jodie Comer
 Peter Dinklage
 Anthony Edwards
 Jessica Lange
 Tatiana Maslany
 Ian McShane
 Elisabeth Moss
 Keri Russell
 Rhea Seehorn
 Jeremy Strong

References

External links
 Official website

Drama